{{DISPLAYTITLE:C17H14O5}}
The molecular formula C17H14O5 (molar mass: 298.29 g/mol, exact mass: 298.084125 u) may refer to:

 Fumarin, a coumarin derivative
 Pterocarpin, a pterocarpan

Molecular formulas